Separate Presidential Brigade is a foot guard brigade in the Ukrainian Armed Forces structure.

Presidential Brigade may also refer to:

 , an operational, light mechanized, brigade in the National Guard of Ukraine structure
 1st Presidential Brigade and 2nd Presidential Brigade, see Iraqi Ground Forces
 Special Presidential Brigade, Zaire